Isaac Kaempfe Rice (born 20 September 2000) is an English professional footballer who currently plays as a defender for Gainsborough Trinity.

Career
On 19 December 2018, Rice signed his first professional contract with Sheffield Wednesday. Rice made his professional debut with Sheffield Wednesday in a 2-0 FA Cup win over Exeter City F.C. on 9 January 2021. On 12 May 2021, it was announced that Rice would be released at the end of his contract.

On 19 August 2021, he signed for Gainsborough Trinity following a brief spell with Newark where he had also appeared in the FA Cup.

Career statistics

References

External links
 
 SWFC Profile

2000 births
Sportspeople from Lincoln, England
Living people
English footballers
Association football defenders
Sheffield Wednesday F.C. players
Newark F.C. players
Gainsborough Trinity F.C. players